John VII may refer to:

 Pope John VII, Pope from 705 to his death in 707
 Patriarch John VII of Constantinople (died prior to 867), Patriarch from 837 to 843
 John VII of Jerusalem, Greek Orthodox Patriarch of Jerusalem from 964 to 966
 John VII, Count of Harcourt (1369-1452)
 John VII Palaiologos (1370–1408), Byzantine Emperor for five months in 1390
 John VII of Werle (c. 1375–1414)
 John VII, Count of Oldenburg (1540–1603)
 Johann V-VII, Duke of Mecklenburg-Schwerin (1558–1592)
 John VII, Count of Nassau-Siegen (1561–1623)

See also
 John 7, the seventh chapter of the Gospel of John
 Ioannes VII (disambiguation)

John 07